Bob Berkowitz is an American journalist, talk show host, and author.

Education 
He holds a degree in business from the State University of New York at Delhi and a B.A. in communications from the University of Denver.

Professional life 
Berkowitz began his career at Associated Press, and is best known as former Senate and White House correspondent for CNN where he was a founding correspondent covering the 1980 presidential campaign. He was general news correspondent for ABC News, and men's correspondent for the Today Show on NBC. He was host of a talk show on the Financial News Network, and also host of Real Personal, a ground-breaking show on CNBC from 1991 to 1994 that dealt with human sexuality.

Berkowitz is a Principal at The Dilenschneider Group, a New York-based strategic communications firm, where he specializes in media, speech, and personal communications training.

He is the co-founder of the Big6 strategy.

Publications 
He co-authored Why Men Stop Having Sex. And What You Can Do Without It with his wife, author Susan Yager, as well as the best-selling What Men Won't Tell You. But Women Need to Know.

References

External links

American male journalists
American television reporters and correspondents
American television talk show hosts
Living people
University of Denver alumni
Year of birth missing (living people)